116P/Wild, also known as Wild 4, is a periodic comet in the Solar System. It fits the definition of an Encke-type comet with (TJupiter > 3; a < aJupiter).

References

External links 
 Orbital simulation from JPL (Java) / Horizons Ephemeris
 116P/Wild 4 – Seiichi Yoshida @ aerith.net
116P at Kronk's Cometography

Periodic comets
0116
Encke-type comets
 
Comets in 2016
19900121